Andrea Miller was the founder and CEO of Tango, a media company focused on romantic love.

Miller is a licensed private pilot and a co-head of the New York Chapter of 85 Broads.

Miller has appeared on The Today Show, CNN, Fox News, ABC, and radio stations across the U.S., as well as in numerous national publications such as USA Today, the Los Angeles Times, and Business Week. She is a frequent panelist and guest speaker in university classes at Harvard University, Columbia University, Fordham University, The Wharton School and New York University.

References

External links

American magazine publishers (people)
Columbia Business School alumni
Tulane University alumni
Goldman Sachs people
Enron people
Living people
Year of birth missing (living people)